John Hasilwood (by 1485 – 1544) was an English politician.

He was an MP and a member of the Middle Temple. He was an MP for Buckingham in 1529. Little is known of Hasilwood. He was not re-elected in 1536; it is thought this was because of his closeness to the faction of Henry VIII's second wife, Queen Anne Boleyn, who had recently been executed for treason and adultery.

References

15th-century births
1544 deaths
Members of the Middle Temple
English MPs 1529–1536